"Lay Down Your Weapons" is a song by British rapper K Koke, featuring British singer Rita Ora. The song was released on 8 March 2013 as a digital download in the United Kingdom and it peaked at number 18 on the UK Singles Chart. The song was included on his debut studio album I Ain't Perfect (2013).

Music video
A music video to accompany the release of "Lay Down Your Weapons" was first released onto YouTube on 20 January 2013 at a total length of four minutes and three seconds.

Track listing

Chart performance
On 17 March 2013 the song entered the UK Singles Chart at number 18, making it his first top 20 song in the UK.

Charts

Release history

References

2013 singles
K Koke songs
Rita Ora songs
RCA Records singles
2013 songs